Sachatamia albomaculata is a species of frog in the family Centrolenidae. It is found in Honduras, Costa Rica, Panama, western Colombia, and northwestern Ecuador. It typically occurs in bushes and trees along forest streams, but populations can persist even along streams in pastures with minimal riparian growth. It is a common species that can locally be threatened by habitat loss but is not facing major threats as a species.

References

Sachatamia
Amphibians of Colombia
Amphibians of Costa Rica
Amphibians of Ecuador
Amphibians of Honduras
Amphibians of Panama
Taxa named by Edward Harrison Taylor
Amphibians described in 1949
Taxonomy articles created by Polbot